The Rounders is a 1914 comedy short starring Charlie Chaplin and Roscoe Arbuckle. The film involves two drunks who get into trouble with their wives, and was written and directed by Chaplin.

Plot
A drunk reveller, Mr. Full, returns home to a scolding from his wife. Then his equally inebriated neighbor, Mr. Fuller, comes home and starts a fight with his wife. When Mrs. Full hears the physical altercation across the hall (Mr. Fuller starts strangling his wife after she hits him), she sends her husband to investigate. The two wives begin arguing, while Mr. Full and Mr. Fuller seize the opportunity to steal their wives’ money and flee together to a cafe, where they also cause trouble. When their spouses find them, they escape to a leaky rowboat on a pond. Safely out of reach of their wives and the victims of the commotion they caused, they fall asleep, oblivious to the rising water into which they eventually disappear.

Cast

 Charlie Chaplin as Mr. Full
 Roscoe Arbuckle as Mr. Fuller
 Phyllis Allen as Mrs. Full
 Minta Durfee as Mrs. Fuller
 Al St. John as Bellhop/Waiter
 Jess Dandy as Diner
 Wallace MacDonald as Diner
 Charley Chase as Diner
 Billy Gilbert as Doorman in blackface (uncredited)
 Cecile Arnold as Hotel guest (uncredited)
 Dixie Chene as Diner (uncredited)
 Edward F. Cline as Hotel guest in lobby (uncredited)
 Ted Edwards as Cop (uncredited)
 William Hauber as Waiter (uncredited)
 Edgar Kennedy in Bit Part (uncredited)

Title
Now somewhat antiquated, the term "rounder" was once commonly used to mean "a habitual drunkard or wastrel".

Review
Moving Picture World wrote, "It is a rough picture for rough people, that people, whether rough or gentle, will probably have to laugh over while it is on the screen. Chas. Chapman [sic] and the Fat Boy appear in this as a couple of genial jags."

See also
 List of American films of 1914
 Charlie Chaplin filmography
 Fatty Arbuckle filmography

References

External links

 
 
 
 

1914 films
1914 comedy films
1914 short films
Silent American comedy films
American silent short films
American black-and-white films
Short films directed by Charlie Chaplin
Films produced by Mack Sennett
Keystone Studios films
Articles containing video clips
1910s American films